Gloria is a cultural arena which has been operating regularly since 1999 and is located in Helsinki at Pieni Roobertinkatu 12–14. The events that have been organized have mostly been focused on music events; however, there have been other events as well such as theater, dance, film, art exhibitions, and outdoor events. From the very beginning, the principle of Gloria has been to create new cultural productions by producing leisure activities together with youth's own operational and cultural groups. In 15 years Gloria has become a unique arena thanks to all the thousands of performers and events. There have been over 50 000 performers, over 3000 events, and well over 700 000 visitors.

Production
Gloria is a cultural arena of Helsinki city's youth center. Gloria's production ranges from opera to rock, performance to art exhibitions, and theater to installations. Gloria's production is based on co-operation with young people as well as with all residents of Helsinki, companies, communities, and bands.

Premises
Gloria's transformable spaces and technology make it possible to have, for example, a play and a rock concert on the same day. The spaces, technology and restaurant services are always modified according to the event. In addition to the stage and transformable spaces, there are light and audio equipment as well as three bar counters. Furthermore Nousu Oy is in charge of Gloria's restaurant services. The main stage is 65m² and the audience capacity is 600 persons in the hall. Depending on the arrangements, altogether 300-400 seats fit on both floors. Gloria has two entrances: the main entrance at Pieni Roobertinkatu meant for the audience and at Yrjönkatu which leads directly to the dressing rooms.

Youth employment
An essential part of Gloria's youth employment activity is employing and finding schools for young people. Gloria employs youth through wage-subsidized work and internships to work as ushers, lighting, video, and audio technicians, as well as producer assistants. In 15 years, Gloria has helped to employ hundreds of youth to become lighting and audio technicians and to work in different event productions. Additionally, Gloria offers a variety of courses that are needed for working life, such as safety at work, fire precautions, and electrical work.

Events in 2013
Gloria organizes numerous events yearly, in 2013 over 200 events were organized in Gloria which included:
 Trash Fest VI
 Musicians Against Racism
 Annyeong! Party XI
 Negative, Hellpunks, The Liar
 Helsinki Lolita Convention

Media
Gloria can be found on Facebook, Twitter, Instagram, and YouTube where it is possible to follow the latest event updates, videos and pictures.

References

External links
Gloria Cultural Arena

Buildings and structures in Helsinki
Music venues in Finland
Kaartinkaupunki